Cartwright is a suburb in south-western Sydney, in the state of New South Wales, Australia 38 kilometres south-west of the Sydney central business district, in the local government area of the City of Liverpool.

Geography 

It is bounded by the suburbs of Prestons, Miller, Ashcroft, Sadlier, Lurnea and Liverpool. Housing in the area is a combination of houses, newly built duplexes and flats. Cabramatta Creek forms the northern (Ashcroft/Sadlier) and west boundary (Miller), Maxwells Creek the east boundary (Liverpool), and Hoxton Park Rd the south boundary (Prestons/Lurnea). There is an extensive network of shared pathways interconnecting the many cul-de-sacs present in the area. A bridge also links it to Miller, crossing over Cabramatta Creek. Liverpool City BMX Club also has its grounds in Powell Park. There is also McGirr Park in the north-east.

History 

Cartwright was officially declared a suburb in 1972 and was developed as part of the Green Valley Housing Estate in the 1960s. It was named after Robert Cartwright who was the reverend of St Luke's church in Liverpool and who received a land grant in the local area.

Education 

Cartwright Public school was opened in 1967. The local high school is Miller Technology High School.

Transport 

It is served by bus services T80, along the dedicated bus T-Way, operated by Transit Systems as are routes 802 and 803. Interline Bus Services operates bus routes 853 and 854.

The main arterial road is Hoxton Park Road, leading to the Hume Highway in the east, connecting to Cowpasture Rd in the west. Cartwright Ave also feeds into smaller streets serving the rest of the suburb.

Demographics 

According to the 2016 census, there were 2,370 residents in Cartwright. 51.1% of people were born in Australia. The most common other countries of birth were Vietnam 6.1%, Iraq 5.1%, New Zealand 2.9%, Lebanon 2.9% and Fiji 1.7%. In Cartwright 44.2% of people only spoke English at home. Other languages spoken at home included Arabic 14.0%, Vietnamese 9.5%, Samoan 4.1%, Spanish 2.3% and Hindi 2.3%. The most common responses for religion in Cartwright were Catholic 21.4%, Islam 14.5% and No Religion 13.8%.

References

Suburbs of Sydney
City of Liverpool (New South Wales)